Rajajinagar is one of the seats in Karnataka Legislative Assembly in India. It is a segment of Bangalore Central Lok Sabha seat.

Members of Vidhan Sabha

Election results

1978 Vidhan Sabha
 Mallur Ananda Rao (JNP) : 42,693 votes 
 B C Somasekhar  (INC-I) : 25,173

2013 Vidhan Sabha
 S Suresh Kumar (BJP) : 39,291 votes  
 R Manjula Naidu (INC) : 24,524 
 Shobha Karandlaje (KJP) : 20,909 
 S T Anand (JD-S) : 16,794

See also 
 List of constituencies of Karnataka Legislative Assembly

References 

Assembly constituencies of Karnataka